Series 80 may refer to:

Transport
 Oldsmobile Series 80, automobile series
 Cadillac Series 80, automobile series

Computing
 Series 80 (software platform), a platform for mobile phones that uses Symbian OS
 HP series 80, line of computers

Other
 Colt Mk IV Series 80, the pistol line